The Red Gods (French: Les dieux rouges) is an adventure novel with elements of fantasy, written by French writer Jean d'Esme, published in 1924.

Overview
The Red Gods finds its locale in the mountainous areas of Indochina. The geographical description of the novel's setting closely resembles that of modern-day Laos.

The novel is narrated by a friend of the protagonist. It is a tale of the protagonist's escape from Indochina, a region ruled and corrupted by its French rulers. On escaping the region, however, he finds himself fighting in World War I, during which he dies. He spends some time in a place characterized by endemic and unseen flora and fauna, inhabited by hunter-gatherers and ruled by priestesses that perform elaborate sacrificial ceremonies.

The Red Gods is the book that brought Jean d'Esme most fame, and remains his last work ever translated into English.

References

1924 French novels
French adventure novels